Camp of Septfonds was a labor camp for men before and during World War II, located in southern France near Septfonds, established in 1939, and run by the French Third Republic and the Vichy government.

The Moldavan-French photojournalist Isaac Kitrosser managed to continue as a photographer while interned at Septfonds. His photographs, including "Cérémonie juive dans le camp de Septfonds," were among the first published concentration camp photos after liberation in 1944.

References

External links
 “Le Camp de Septfonds,” Musée français de la photographie, Histoires De Photographies 
 “Cérémonie juive dans le camp de Septfonds,” Musée français de la photographie, Histoires De Photographies 

Vichy France